Artur Khazrailovich Karezhev (born 4 July  1980) is a former Russian professional football player.

Club career
He played in the Russian Football National League for PFC Spartak Nalchik in 1999.

References

1980 births
Living people
Russian footballers
Association football midfielders
PFC Spartak Nalchik players
FC Spartak Kostroma players